Vladimir Vadimovich Komarov (born August 2, 1980) is a former Russian professional footballer.

He made his debut in the Russian Premier League in 1999 for FC Rostselmash Rostov-on-Don, and played three games for them in the 1999 UEFA Intertoto Cup.

References

1980 births
Living people
Russian footballers
FC Rostov players
Russian Premier League players
FC Volgar Astrakhan players
Association football defenders
FC Neftekhimik Nizhnekamsk players